Dunning is one of 77 officially designated community areas of the city of Chicago, Illinois. Dunning also is a neighborhood located on the Northwest Side of the city.

The neighborhood is home to Wilbur Wright College, Mount Olive Cemetery, Zion Gardens Cemetery, and the Eli's Cheesecake factory.

It is also the location of the Chicago-Read Mental Health Center, formerly known as Cook County Insane Asylum and commonly referred to, in its day, as simply "Dunning."

History

Beginnings
In 1851 this remote prairie location seemed ideal for Cook County's plans to erect a poor farm, potter's field and asylum for the insane. The county purchased from Peter Ludby 160 acres hemmed in by Irving Park Road and Narragansett, Montrose, and Oak Park Avenues. Both facilities were housed in a three-story building situated atop a ridge.

Residents of the poor farm lived with their families growing vegetables, washing their clothes, and attending school on the premises. After 1863 the institution also admitted tuberculosis patients. The county built a separate building for the insane asylum in 1870. The construction of two more buildings in the 1880s added enough space to accommodate the more than 1,000 patients.

Following the Civil War, Andrew Dunning purchased 120 acres just south of the county property to start a nursery and lay the groundwork for a village. He set aside 40 acres for the settlement, but proximity to the insane hospital kept settlers away.

Initially transportation links were poor. Although trains brought employees and commuters from the city, visitors had to walk two and a half miles from the depot to the county farm. After a single three-mile track was extended to the facilities in 1882, the Chicago, Milwaukee & St. Paul Railway's "crazy train" brought patients, supplies, and medicines. The county built a station, naming it for Dunning.

Development
In the 1880s and 1890s Dunning's rolling landscape remained sparsely settled. The Scandinavian Lutheran Cemetery Association bought 65 acres south of Dunning's property in 1886 which became Mount Olive Cemetery. Jewish families purchased 40 acres between the Scandinavian cemetery and Addison for burials.

Around the turn of the century Henry Kolze inherited a tavern and wooded acreage at Narragansett and Irving Park which he turned into a picnic grove, known as Kolze's Grove, or Kolze's Electric Park. The idyllic scenery enticed visitors, as did the tavern. With the advent of the Irving Park Boulevard street railway, clubs, churches, and companies held picnics in the grove. Based on records from the Chicago Department of Revenue, we know that in 1910 other similar venues such as Kosciuzko Grove were also in the Dunning area.

The infirmary, poorhouse, and asylum eventually became overcrowded. Minimal heat in winter, no hot water, and poor ventilation contributed to the deaths of many patients and inmates. In 1886 an official investigation found misconduct, gambling, patient abuse, and "influence" in the hiring of medical personnel. After 1910 the poor farm was moved to Oak Forest, and two years later the state bought the mental hospital and property for one dollar. Although it was called the Chicago State Hospital, many continued to refer to the institution simply as Dunning.

In 1989, during development near Irving Park Rd. and Narragansett Ave., human remains were discovered.  Research led to the re-discovery of the Cook County Potter's Field, which had been located near the poor house and insane asylum.  Approximately 38,000 people were buried there between the 1850s and the 1920s.  A small park called the Read Dunning Memorial Park was established in 2002 as a memorial for those buried in the area. 
.

Residential settlement
Outside the state facility, the population had grown to only 1,305 by 1909. In 1916 the first housing boom occurred when Schorsch Brothers Real Estate bought a tract west of Austin and south of Irving Park. They called the area West Portage Park to remove the stigma of association with Dunning.

Following World War I the population rose to 4,019, with residents primarily of Swedish, German, and Polish descent. In 1934 Wright Junior College was built in the eastern portion. At its peak in 1970 population reached 43,856 but fell to 36,957 by 1990. The State Hospital property stood in shambles and in the 1970s nearly half the buildings were razed. In that year, the Chicago-Read Mental Health Center was established, incorporating the old hospitals.

Present
Dunning currently borders the villages of Harwood Heights, Norridge, River Grove, as well as Elmwood Park. Many of the neighborhood's residents are city workers, including police officers and firefighters. The area is close to the Harlem Irving Plaza shopping center.

Dunning moved toward a revival of institutional, commercial, and residential growth in the 1980s and 1990s. The neighborhoods of Schorsch Village, Belmont Heights, Belmont Terrace, and Irving Woods became more desirable. On Narragansett, north of Irving Park, Ridgemoor Estates boasted luxury homes near a golf club. New modern facilities were present at Chicago-Read Mental Health Center. Wright Junior College expanded with futuristic-style buildings and a learning resource center at Narragansett and Montrose. By 2000 the population had grown again, to 42,164. One in 3 people in Dunning is of Polish descent — the highest rate of any ethnic group in any Chicago neighborhood, according to the 2010 U.S. Census

Politics
Dunning has voted for the Democratic Party in the past two presidential elections. In the 2016 presidential election, Dunning cast 8,712 votes for Hillary Clinton and cast 5,342 votes for Donald Trump. In the 2012 presidential election, Dunning cast 8,415 votes for Barack Obama and cast 4,452 votes for Mitt Romney.

Notable people
 Andrzej Czuma, 21st Polish Minister of Justice and member of the Sejm from Warsaw I. He lived in Dunning while a political refugee from the Polish People's Republic.
 Chester P. Majewski, member of the Illinois House of Representatives. He resided at 3906 North Oketo Avenue during his legislative tenure.
 Danny Seraphine, a founding member and former drummer for the band Chicago, is from Dunning.

References

External links
 Official City of Chicago Dunning Community Map
 Chicago Park District
 Merrimac Park
 Shabbona Park

Community areas of Chicago
North Side, Chicago
Populated places established in 1851
1851 establishments in Illinois
Polish-American culture in Chicago
Italian-American culture in Chicago